Sacred Heart Catholic Church and Rectory may refer to:

 Sacred Heart Catholic Church and Rectory (Prescott, Arizona), listed on the National Register of Historic Places in Yavapai County, Arizona
 Sacred Heart Catholic Church and Rectory (Wilburton, Oklahoma), listed on the National Register of Historic Places in Latimer County, Oklahoma